A dialect is a variety of spoken or written language.

Dialect(s) may also refer to:

Dialect continuum
Dialect (computing)
Di•a•lects, a 1986 album by Joe Zawinul

See also
Dialectic, a method of argument
Eye dialect